The Association of American Schools in South America (AASSA) is a non-profit, 501-c3 organization that was established in 1961 "to discover and develop ways and means for improving understanding through international education."  All schools in the organization are private, college preparatory schools that offer a predominantly American curriculum taught in English.  All Full Member schools must meet accreditation standards set by the AASSA board.

Currently, they have 50 full members and 33 invitational members.

Full Member Schools

Argentina 
Asociación Escuelas Lincoln

Bolivia 
The American International School of Bolivia

Brazil 
American School of Belo Horizonte
American School of Brasília
American School of Recife
American School of Rio de Janeiro
Associacao Escola do Futuro
Associacao Escola Guaduada de Sao Paulo
Chapel School-Escola Maria Imaculada
Escola Americana de Campinas
International School of Curitiba
Our Lady of Mercy School, Rio de Janeiro
Pan American Christian Academy
Pan American School of Bahia
Pan American School of Porto Alegre
Rio International School
School of the Nations (Brasília)

Cayman Islands 
 Cayman International School

Chile 
International School Nido de Aguilas

Colombia 
Colegio Albania (Albania School)
Colegio Karl C. Parrish
Colegio Nueva Granada
Colegio Jorge Washington (also The George Washington School)
Colombus School
Colegio Granadino
Colegio Bolivar
Knightsbridge Schools International Bogotá (Bogotá)

Curacao 
 International School of Curacao

Ecuador 
Academia Cotopaxi
Alliance Academy International
American School of Quito
Colegio Alberto Einstein
Colegio Menor de San Francisco (Quito & Samborondon Campuses)
Inter-American Academy of Guayaquil

El Salvador 
 Escuela Americana El Salvador

Guatemala 
 American School of Guatemala

Guyana 
Georgetown International Academy

Honduras 
 Alison Bixby Stone School
 American School of Tegucigalpa

Jamaica 
 American International School of Kingston

Panama 
 Crossroads Christian Academy
 Magen David Academy

Paraguay 
American School of Asuncion

Peru 
Colegio Franklin D. Roosevelt

Trinidad and Tobago 
International School Port of Spain

Uruguay 
Uruguayan American School

Venezuela 
Centro Educativo Internacional Anzoategui
Colegio Internacional de Carabobo
Colegio Internacional de Caracas
Colegio Internacional Puerto La Cruz
Escuela Bella Vista
Escuela Campo Alegre
Escuela Las Morochas
International School of Monagas
The British School Caracas

Invitational Member Schools

Bolivia 
 American Cooperative School
 Santa Cruz Cooperative School

Brazil 
 Avenues Sao Paulo Fuducacao Ltda.
 Escola Beit Yaacov
 Escola Pueri Domus/global Education
 Sant'Anna American International School

Colombia 
 Asociacion Colegio Granadino
 Colegio Albania
 Colegio Bilingue Richmond
 Colegio Bolivar
 Colegio Bureche
 Colegio Jorge Washington
 Colegio Panamericano
 GI School
 La Sierra International School
 The Victoria School

Costa Rica 
 Kabe International Academy
 Lincoln School

Cuba 
 International School of Havana

Dominican Republic 
 Carol Morgan School

Ecuador 
 ISM International Academy

El Salvador 
 Escuela Americana El Salvador

Guatemala 
 Colegio Interamericano de Guatemala
 Colegio Maya

Haiti 
 Union School

Honduras 
 Escuela Internacional Sampedrana

Mexico 
 American School Foundation of Monterrey
 Colegio Atid
 Peterson Schools
 The American School Foundation
 The American School Foundation of Guadalajara A.C.
 Westhill Institute SC

Panama 
 The International School of Panama
 The Metropolitan School of Panama

References

External links
Official AASSA site

 
School accreditors
Private and independent school organizations
International school associations